Marmaroglypha nicobarica is a species of beetle in the family Cerambycidae. It was described by Redtenbacher in 1868. It is known from the Nicobar Islands.

References

Lamiini
Beetles described in 1868